David William Christian (born May 12, 1959) is an American former professional ice hockey forward. He played on the 1980 U.S. Olympic hockey team that won the gold medal during the 1980 Winter Olympics. Additionally he played for five National Hockey League teams over a 15-season career.

Amateur career
Christian was born in Warroad, Minnesota, and grew up playing hockey, gridiron football, and baseball, as well as competing on the track and field team, for Warroad High School. He later attended the University of North Dakota in Grand Forks, where he played for the North Dakota Fighting Sioux hockey team and played in the 1979 national championship, but North Dakota lost the final to the University of Minnesota and Christian's future Olympic teammate, Neal Broten.

Professional and international career

Christian is best known for being a member of the 1980 U.S. Olympic hockey team that won the gold medal in an event known as the Miracle on Ice during the 1980 Winter Olympics. He also played for the U.S. national team at the 1981 Canada Cup as well as the 1981 Ice Hockey World Championship tournaments as an NHL rookie. His international career continued in the 1984 Canada Cup, 1989 Ice Hockey World Championship and 1991 Canada Cup tournaments.

Christian's professional hockey career started one week after the Miracle on Ice when he joined the Winnipeg Jets, who drafted him 40th overall in the 1979 NHL Entry Draft. Christian set and still holds the record for the fastest goal by a player in his first NHL game, scoring just 7 seconds into his first shift, electrifying the crowd. After a roller-coaster career in Winnipeg, where he scored 70 or more points in both seasons following the 1980 Olympics, he went on to play with the Washington Capitals where he led the team in assists his first season there, with 52. He also added 29 goals, and after the Capitals he would go on to play with the Chicago Blackhawks, Boston Bruins and St. Louis Blues ending his NHL career with 340 goals and 433 assists in 1,009 NHL regular season games. He also made an appearance in the Stanley Cup Finals as a member of the Boston Bruins in 1990, losing to the Edmonton Oilers in five games.

Post career
Christian was named head coach and general manager of the United States Hockey League Fargo-Moorhead Ice Sharks near the end of the 1997–98 season and held the positions through the 1999–2000 season.

Family
Christian comes from a family of hockey players. His father Bill and uncle Roger were members of the 1960 U.S. Olympic Hockey Team that won the gold medal. Another uncle, Gordon, was a member of the 1956 U.S. Olympic Hockey Team that won the silver medal. Bill and Roger, along with Hal Bakke, were the founders of the Christian Brothers Hockey Company based in Warroad, which until 2009, made hockey sticks. His nephew, Brock Nelson, currently plays for the New York Islanders.

Awards and achievements
Christian was inducted into the United States Hockey Hall of Fame in 2001.
Christian played in the 1991 NHL All-Star Game

Career statistics

Regular season and playoffs

International

In popular culture
In the 1981 TV movie about the gold medal-winning hockey team entitled Miracle on Ice, Christian is played by Thomas F. Duffy.

In the 2004 Disney film Miracle, he is played by Steve Kovalcik.

See also
List of members of the United States Hockey Hall of Fame
List of NHL players with 1000 games played
List of Olympic medalist families

References

External links
 
 Profile at hockeydraftcentral.com

1959 births
1980 US Olympic ice hockey team
American men's ice hockey right wingers
Boston Bruins players
Chicago Blackhawks players
Ice hockey players from Minnesota
Ice hockey players at the 1980 Winter Olympics
Indianapolis Ice players
Living people
Medalists at the 1980 Winter Olympics
Warroad Lakers players
Minnesota Moose players
National Hockey League All-Stars
North Dakota Fighting Hawks men's ice hockey players
Olympic gold medalists for the United States in ice hockey
People from Warroad, Minnesota
St. Louis Blues players
United States Hockey Hall of Fame inductees
Washington Capitals players
Winnipeg Jets (1972–1996) captains
Winnipeg Jets (1979–1996) draft picks
Winnipeg Jets (1979–1996) players